Frank Bennett, Jr. (March 8, 1879 – January 5, 1936) was a college football player.

Early years
Bennett was the son of a Confederate captain.

University of North Carolina
He was a prominent tackle for the North Carolina Tar Heels football teams of the University of North Carolina. He was selected third-team for an all-time Carolina football team of Dr. R. B. Lawson in 1934.

1898
Bennett was selected All-Southern in 1898. North Carolina won the South and posted its only undefeated record to date.

1900
Bennett was selected All-Southern in 1900.

1901
He was captain of the 1901 team.

References

External links

North Carolina Tar Heels football players
All-Southern college football players
American football tackles
People from Wadesboro, North Carolina
Players of American football from North Carolina
19th-century players of American football
1879 births
1936 deaths